The Fogo Regional Football Association (Portuguese: Associação Regional de Futebol do Fogo, abbreviation: ARFF) is a football (soccer) association covering the island of Fogo.  It is headquartered in the city of São Filipe, the island capital.
The Fogo Premier Division is a regional championship played in Fogo Island, Cape Verde. The winner of the championship plays in the Cape Verdean football Championships of each season.  Its current president is Pedro Fernandes Pires since September 2015.

About the Island/Regional League's area
The area includes the whole island.

Organization
The association also organizes and functions the Fogo Regional Championships, the Cup, the Super Cup, the Opening Tournament and now the Champions' Cup.  The association has 20 registered clubs, Académica Fogo and Botafogo are pro clubs and Vulcânicos is a semi-pro club, the remaining are amateur, beginner and starter clubs.  The regional champion competes in the National Championships each season, once did in the cup (2007, 2009, 2010, 2012) competition who competed at the national level. The association has the third largest number of clubs after Santiago's two zones and ahead of São Vicente. The regional championships has two divisions, each with ten clubs.

Fogo Premier Division (10 clubs)
Fogo Second Division (10 clubs)

About the Island/Regional Association
They are one of three regional associations that maintain more than one venue.

Before the championship was established, the first football/soccer club was Vulcânicos which was founded in 1953, then Académica was founded later in 1962 and Botafogo was founded in 1968  More clubs were created after the foundation of the championships including Cutelinho in 1983 and Desportivo de Cova Figueira in 1994, the newest clubs are Spartak d'Aguadinha established in 2003 and Valência in 2004.

In the early -2000s, it would become the next island league to also have a second division.  The last place club were relegated, from around 2009, the ninth placed club plays with a runner up of the Second Division in a division decisional match. At that time, Fogo had the third most number of clubs in the nation.  In 2017, two last placed clubs will be relegated and participate in the Second Division in the following season.   

One of the largest scoring matches in league history is Spartak d'Aguadinha.  Spartak has one of the highest numbers of goals scored in a single season with 73 in the 2014-15 season.

In the second division on February 11, 2017, Nova Era defeated Brasilim 0-20 and made it the highest scoring match to date of any of the regional leagues and one of the highest in history.  It put the club into the promotional zone and put União out from ever returning to the Premier Division.

Registered clubs
The region's registered clubs as of November 2017.

 ABC de Patim
 Académica do Fogo
 Atlântico - São Filipe
 Atlético - Mosteiros
 Baxada (Baixada Fluminense), also known as Beira-Mar - Cova Figueira 
 Botafogo (São Filipe)
 Brasilim - Monte Vaca, São Filipe
 Cutelinho FC (Mosteiros)
 Esperança - Achada Furna
 Figueira Pavão (registered in September 2017)
 Grito Povo - Ribeira do Ilheu
 Juventude - São Filipe
 Juventus Curral Grande (registered in September 2017)
 Luzabril - Luzia Nunes
 No Pintcha - Mosteiros
 Nova Era - São Filipe
 Parque Real - Cova Figueira
 Spartak (Aguadinha)
 União FC - São Lourenço
 Valência - Às-Hortas
 Vulcânicos (São Filipe)

Former clubs
Dynamo de Cova Figueira - now part of either Desportivo Cova Figueira or Parque Real
Tribo do Sol (2006-2008) - now part of Nova Era

See also
Sports in Fogo, Cape Verde

References

External links
Official website 

Association football governing bodies in Cape Verde
Sport in Fogo, Cape Verde
1975 establishments in Cape Verde